These are the rosters of all participating teams at the women's water polo tournament at the 2000 Summer Olympics in Sydney. The ten national teams were required to submit squads of 12 players. Additionally, teams could name one alternate player. In the event that a player on the submitted squad list suffered an injury or illness, that player would be able to be replaced by the player in the alternate list.

Australia
The following players represented Australia:

Naomi Castle
Joanne Fox
Bridgette Gusterson
Simone Hankin
Yvette Higgins
Kate Hooper
Bronwyn Mayer
Gail Miller
Melissa Mills
Debbie Watson
Liz Weekes
Danielle Woodhouse
Taryn Woods

Canada
The following players represented Canada:

Marie Luc Arpin
Isabelle Auger
Johanne Bégin
Cora Campbell
Melissa Collins
Marie-Claude Deslières
Valérie Dionne
Ann Dow
Susan Gardiner
Waneek Horn-Miller
Sandra Lizé
Josée Marsolais
Jana Salat

Kazakhstan
The following players represented Kazakhstan:

Rezeda Aleyeva
Anastasiya Boroda
Irina Borodavko
Svetlana Buravova
Asel Dzhakayeva
Nataliya Galkina
Yekaterina Gerzanich
Tatyana Gubina
Nataliya Ignatyeva
Svetlana Korolyova
Olga Leshchuk
Larisa Olkhina
Yuliya Pyryseva

Netherlands
The following players represented the Netherlands:

Hellen Boering
Daniëlle de Bruijn
Edmée Hiemstra
Karin Kuipers
Ingrid Leijendekker
Patricia Megens
Marjan op den Velde
Mirjam Overdam
Heleen Peerenboom
Karla Plugge
Carla Quint
Gillian van den Berg
Ellen van der Weijden-Bast

Russia
The following players represented Russia:

Marina Akobiya
Ekaterina Anikeeva
Sofia Konukh
Maria Koroleva
Natalia Kutuzova
Svetlana Kuzina
Tatiana Petrova
Yuliya Petrova
Galina Rytova
Elena Smurova
Elena Tokun
Irina Tolkunova
Ekaterina Vasilieva

United States
The following players represented the United States:

Robin Beauregard
Ellen Estes
Courtney Johnson
Ericka Lorenz
Heather Moody
Bernice Orwig
Maureen O'Toole
Nicolle Payne
Heather Petri
Kathy Sheehy
Coralie Simmons
Julie Swail
Brenda Villa

References

Men's team rosters
 
2000
Olymp